is the fifth indie single by the Japanese girl idol group Shiritsu Ebisu Chugaku (or sixth counting one cover single), released in Japan on October 5, 2011 on the indie label Stardust Digital.

Composition 
Jacques Offenbach's Infernal Galop (known as can-can) is used in the title song, "Motto Hashire!!"

History 
The single achieved the 7th position in the Oricon Daily Singles Chart. In the Oricon Weekly Singles Chart, it ranked 46th (in the chart from November 14, 2011).

Members 
Mizuki, Reina Miyazaki, Rika Mayama, Natsu Anno, Ayaka Yasumoto, Aika Hirota, Mirei Hoshina, Hirono Suzuki, Rina Matsuno, Hinata Kashiwagi

Track listing

Charts

References

External links 
 Releases - Motto Hashire!! - Shiritsu Ebisu Chugaku official site
 Motto Hashire!! - HMV Online

Shiritsu Ebisu Chugaku songs
2011 singles
Japanese-language songs
Songs written by Kenichi Maeyamada